Trevor Huddleston (born May 31, 1996) is an American stock car racing driver who competes full-time in the ARCA Menards Series West, driving the No. 50 Ford for his family-owned team High Point Racing.

Racing career
Huddleston started his career in bandolero racing in 2008. After racing in the Sportsman class at Irwindale Speedway in 2011, Huddleston raced late models at Madera Speedway in 2014. Throughout his career, he has raced for High Point Racing, which his father owns. The following year, Huddleston claimed his first Irwindale track championship, winning five late model races.

For the 2016 season, Huddleston raced almost exclusively at Irwindale Speedway, winning ten races. He also made his NASCAR K&N Pro Series West debut with Sunrise Ford Racing, finishing tenth at Irwindale.

In 2017, Huddleston competed at Irwindale, Kern County Raceway Park and Tucson Speedway. Between the three, he raced 35 times and won 22 of those. After staying in contention all year, Huddleston finished three points behind Lee Pulliam for the NASCAR Whelen All-American Series title.

In 2018, Huddleston returned to the K&N Pro Series West for what he presumed to be a limited slate with Sunrise Ford Racing; eventually, it turned into a full-season effort.

On March 30, 2019, Huddleston earned his first career K&N Pro Series win, scoring the victory at his home track of Irwindale in a photo finish over Tanner Gray.

Huddleston moved to Sunrise Ford's No. 6 in 2020 and remained in the ride for 2021.

For 2022, after he lost his ride to Tanner Reif, he joined the first Irwindale race for his family-owned team High Point Racing in the No. 50 Ford.

Personal life
Huddleston attends Moorpark College. His father, Tim, was also a track champion at Irwindale.

Motorsports career results

ARCA Menards Series
(key) (Bold – Pole position awarded by qualifying time. Italics – Pole position earned by points standings or practice time. * – Most laps led. ** – All laps led.)

ARCA Menards Series West

 Season still in progress

References

External links
 

1966 births
Living people
NASCAR drivers
Racing drivers from California
People from Agoura Hills, California